Lepidostoma cinereum is a species of bizarre caddisfly in the family Lepidostomatidae. It is found in North America.

References

Trichoptera
Articles created by Qbugbot
Insects described in 1899